= Mother of Rivers =

The term Mother of Rivers can refer to:

- Colorado, a state in the United States
- Mekong, a major river in Asia
